is a Philippine-born Japanese actress, fashion model and singer. She began modeling in 2009 after winning the "Grand Priz Nicola Model Audition 2009". Her mother is of Spanish Filipino Chinese descent and her father is Japanese.

Filmography

Film
 As director
 Town Without Sea (2020)
 As actress
 The Virgin Psychics (2015) – Miyuki Hirano
 Wolf Girl and Black Prince (2016) – Aki Tezuka
 ReLIFE (2017) – Rena Kariu
 Tori Girl (2017) – Kazumi Shimamura
 Bow Then Kiss (2017) – Anne Kishimoto
 The Many Faces of Ito (2018) – Satoko Aida (C)
 My Little Monster (2018) – Asako Natsume
 Sunny: Our Hearts Beat Together (2018) – Nana
 Million Dollar Man (2018)
 Sadako (2019) – Mayu Akikawa
 Kakegurui – Compulsive Gambler (2019) - Kirari Momobami / Ririka Momobami
 Not Quite Dead Yet (2020)
 Kiba: The Fangs of Fiction (2021)
 Kakegurui – Compulsive Gambler Part 2 (2021) - Kirari Momobami / Ririka Momobami
 The Midnight Maiden War (2022)
 Haw (2022) – Momoko

Television
 Hokusai to Meshi Saereba (TBS-MBS, 2017), Ayako Arikawa
 Himana Joshidai Sei (TV Asahi, 2017), Mayu Mita
 Inside Mari (Fuji TV, 2017), Mari Yoshizaki
  Followers  (Netflix, 2020), Natsume Hyakuta 
 Komi Can't Communicate (NHK General TV, 2021), Shouko Komi
Umeko: The Face of Female Education (TV Asahi, 2022), Yamakawa Sutematsu
Doronjo (Wowow, 2022), Nao Dorokawa/Dronjo
Inori no Karte: Kenshūi no Nazotoki Shinsatsu Kiroku (NTV, 2022), Midori Soneda

Music videos
 sub/objective (2015) 
 CITI (2015) 
 Sunrise(re-build) (2016)

References

External links
  
 

1996 births
Living people
21st-century Japanese actresses
21st-century Japanese women singers
Japanese female models
Japanese film actresses
Japanese television actresses
Japanese women pop singers
Japanese people of Spanish descent
People from Fukuoka